Youth With You, also known by its Chinese title Qīng Chūn Yǒu Nǐ or simply QCYN, is a 2019 Chinese male group survival show that premiered on January 21, 2019 on iQIYI. Called Idol Producer Season 2 before filming, it is the second edition of the 2018 male competition show Idol Producer, and the first edition of the survival show Youth With You. It is presented by Lay Zhang, with Li Ronghao, Jolin Tsai, MC Jin, The8 (Xu Minghao), and After Journey serving as the coaches. The show brought together 100 trainees from different entertainment agencies, and only nine of all trainees were selected to debut through viewers' votes. On April 6, 2019, the final nine contestants debuted as UNINE.

Concept 
Youth With You brings 100 trainees together who are either from entertainment agencies or aren't signed under any company, and nine trainees will be selected through viewers' votes to form a boy group after weeks of evaluations, group performances, and eliminations.

Coaches

Main 

 Lay Zhang— Production director (PD) and presenter

Lay Zhang is a representative of the youth producers in Youth With You. He hopes that he can share his stage experience in this show and helps the trainees to have huge progress. In the program, Zhang and the other coaches will teach the trainees how to perform better on the stage with a professional and rigorous attitude. He will become a strict mentor during the process of trainees' competition. Zhang returned as the production director (PD) and presenter from Idol Producer, the first official season of iQIYI’s survival show series.

Li Ronghao — Vocal mentor

Li Ronghao is a music instructor in Youth With You. Li Ronghao will help trainees become a better idol and share his experiences to guide those trainees. Li returned as the vocal mentor from Idol Producer.

Jolin Tsai— Dance mentor

Jolin Tsai is a dance instructor in Youth With You. Jolin Tsai will share her experience of performances and gives correct guidance to the trainees. As an "Asian pop queen", she will teach trainees how to master the stage in the show.

Xu Minghao — Dance trainer

Xu Minghao is a dance instructor in Youth With You. Xu Minghao will teach the trainees by himself and accompany trainees to train. In the talent show, Xu Minghao will accompany trainees and share his practical experience with trainees.

MC Jin — Rap mentor

MC Jin is a rap instructor in Youth With You. MC Jin will share his experience and guide the trainees to become a better rapper. Known as the "Chinese rap legend," MC Jin will share his secret of mastering the rhythm of rap. In the talent show, MC Jin will learn Chinese with the trainees and work with trainees together. He returned as the rap mentor from Idol Producer.

After Journey — Rap mentor

After Journey is a rap instructor in Youth With You. After Journey will teach the trainees by himself and regularly check the improvements of trainees. After Journey will help the trainees become more professional. In the talent show, as a rapper, After Journey will teach the Chinese rap of the trainees.

Art advisory group 

 Jiang Dawei
Huang Doudou
Teng Shichu
Wang Jieshi

Contestants 
Color key
 Left the show
 Top 9 of the week
 Top 9 of the week [Live only]
 Contestants saved by Art Advisory group's vote
 Eliminated in Episode 5
 Eliminated in Episode 8
 Eliminated in Episode 10
 Eliminated in Episode 12
 Final member of UNINE

Top 9

Elimination Chart 
Color key

Episodes

Episode 1 
The trainees enter the main stage and seat themselves according to their rankings from the initial 24-hour pick results displayed on the small screen. The top 60 trainees are arranged in the first waiting area, while the last 39 trainees must leave and sit in the second waiting area, which is an unheated glass box outside the main recording set. They watch the performances on a monitor. The trainees begin performing in groups. The performances are grouped according to their companies. The instructors then evaluate for the initial rating of A, B, C, D or F based on the comprehensive ability of the trainees, with A being the highest and F being the lowest.

Episode 2 
The initial grade evaluation of the trainees continues. After the performance of the 99 trainees, there were 11 people in Class B, 24 in Class C, 44 in Class D, and 20 in Class F. No one in this season was assigned to Class A in the initial rating, which broke the precedent. The first task was released: perform the theme song of the programme. Trainees need to learn all the contents and dance of the theme song, "Youth With You (青春有你)" in the assigned classes within three days with other trainees of the same level. The trainees allocate the dormitory according to the initial grade. Instructor Xu Minghao makes a late night visit to the trainees practicing and gives them guidance for learning the dance.

Episode 3 
The vocal and dance training of the first task continues. After three days of training, the trainees receive a single opportunity to record an individual performance of the theme song and received a re-evaluation from the instructors. The results of the grade evaluation are 10 in class A, 14 in class B, 20 in class C, 31 in class D, and 24 in class F.

After the re-evaluation, the trainees perform the rehearsal of the theme song stage performance according to their new rankings.  Lay Zhang, decides to move an additional 12 trainees to higher ranks after watching their rehearsal. The final grade evaluation results are 13 in Class A, 15 in Class B, 20 in Class C, 31 in Class D, and 20 in Class F. This final rating determines the position of the trainees on the theme song performance stage.

The A-ranked trainees each perform their killing part for the theme song, and the other class trainees voted for who they wanted as a center position for the theme song. Zhang Yixing makes the final decision to break the tie between Li Wenhan and Lian Huaiwei. Li Wenhan was selected as the center position.

Each trainee gets 5 minutes to talk to his family before the Spring Festival.

After recording "Youth With You", the second challenge is revealed. The trainees will be put into 16 teams to perform 8 songs. Two teams will be performing and competing against each other for each of the 8 songs: A-Mei's "Fire (火)", HIT-5's "Fight (斗)", Lay Zhang‘s "NAMANANA", Taeyang's "Eyes Nose Lips", Silence Wang's "A beautiful smile(一笑倾城)", "A Neighbor Named Taishan(隔壁泰山)", Gen Neo's "Reverse", and "DREAM".

Li Wenhan receives the most votes for who each trainee wishes to perform with the most and earns the right to choose his song and teammates. The additional teams and songs are decided based on a random ball draw.

Episode 4 
The group's leaders receive their results from Lay Zhang before the beginning of the performance. After receiving the result, the group leader can choose to look it by himself or with his group members.

Eight groups that successfully go on the stage to perform live and get the votes from 600 youth producers on site. After each group finished their performance, youth producers on site can vote for their favorite trainee. If the youth producer is not satisfied with the performance of a certain group, they can abstain from voting. Deng Chaoyuan from "DREAM" Team B wins the most votes overall with 199 votes. Each trainee's obtained live votes are multiplied by 100 and then added into the online votes to determine the Top 60. Because of no performances on stage, the other eight groups receive zero additional votes from this mission.

Episode 5 
The top 60 trainees with the most votes are announced, starting from rank 59. Additional footage of trainee activities is shown between ranking announcements. The trainees are polled for the "most handsome" and "who I would like to introduce to my little sister". Mavericks trainee Yao Chi is selected as the "top visual".

The trainees and program staff have a game of tug-of-war, in order to win meat and dishes for a hot pot. If the teams of trainees win the round, everyone will receive a corresponding reward. Because the trainees express gratitude towards the staff, they are rewarded the entire hot pot prize and everyone makes the trip.

Instructor MC Jin hosts a rap class for interested trainees. They are given an assignment beforehand to write lyrics for one of three accompaniments prepared by MC Jin tutor and present their raps to the rest of the trainees.

Li Wenhan claims rank 1, while Yao Bolan is revealed as rank 60, saving himself from elimination. The other contenders were Wu Fei, Qi Haoran and Zhen Nan. In addition, the Artist Advisory Council evaluates trainees' potential based on their group performances, thus recommending 10 trainees to advance to the next stage of the competition. 8 recommended trainees are already in the top 60 (marked on a pink background), but Manny and Fu Hongyi are saved. The remaining time is given to the trainees to say their goodbyes.

Episode 6

Instructor Li Ronghao hosts a songwriting class for interested trainees. Li Ronghao asks the trainees to show their original works first and gives them feedback. Each trainee was then assigned genre that they were not good at, and given three days to write a song in that genre before presenting their work.

The position evaluation mission provides the trainees with three different roles (vocal, dance, rap) for them to choose from, and the trainees will select the corresponding songs according to their chosen group role. There are five songs in the vocal category:(A-Mei's "You Love Me (你是爱我的)", William Wei's "Wait Slowly (慢慢等)", Eric Chou's "what's up (怎么了)", Lala Hsu's "Disappointed Desert (失落沙洲)" and Li Ronghao's "Ears (耳朵)"; four songs in the rap category: (GAI 周延's "Big Shot (大人物)", Will Pan's "Coming Home", A-Mei's "Brave" and Antonin Leopold Dvoárk's "Inner World"); and three songs in the dance category: (NICKTHEREAL's "Turn Up", Jolin Tsai's "Chivalry (骑士精神)", and William Chan's "A Trait of Jianghu (一笔江湖)".

The trainees with higher rankings pick their songs first, and each song is available until the member limit is reached. The winning member of each group will gain 50,000 votes, and the winning trainee in each category will receive an extra 100,000 votes, totaling to 150,000 votes. The trainee's accumulated votes are reset to zero for this challenge.

The trainees decide on the group leaders and center positions and begin practice and receive advice from the mentors. The groups for "你是爱我的(You Love Me)“, "Turn Up", "大人物(Big Shot)”, and "慢慢等(Wait Slowly)“ perform.

Episode 7 
Due to a sudden ban on broadcasting light or brightly dyed hair, airing for this episode was delayed for a week.

Jiang Dawei, a member of the Artist Advisory Council, gives an open class to all the trainees after the second performance, sharing his insights into music according to his experiences. At the end of the open class, Jiang Dawei also announced a charitable activity called “Reading Youth”. The trainees will need to share and recommend their favorite books before the release of rankings in the second performance group.

The remaining performance is aired. Afterward, the live audience votes are calculated and revealed to the trainees. Xia Hanyu from "你是爱我的(You Love Me)“ receives the most votes overall and wins the vocal category with 362 votes, Hu Chunyang from "Inner World" wins the rap category with 272 votes, and Guan Yue from "Turn Up" wins the dance category with 228 votes. They all received 150,000 additional votes. The first place member in each group receives 50,000 votes. Lastly, every trainee also gets the live votes they received from their performance added to their online votes to determine the ranks for Top 35.

Episode 8 
The next task is revealed: a concept evaluation performance. This mission will help the trainees find their own style. Five new songs written by both national and international top music producers and production teams are offered. The trainees will become the original singers for those songs. The youth producers voted for which concept they believed was most suitable for trainees from February 22 to 26, 2019. The second-ranking announcement will be held during the training of this task. Therefore, only the top 35 trainees are eligible to stand on the stage, while the rest of the trainees will leave the show during training, and they cannot participate in the performance. Before the second-ranking was announced, each group is temporarily divided into two groups for training, and each group selects the team leader and the center position.

Trainees each receive an envelope from Lay Zhang and move to the corresponding training room according to the number on the song card. The trainees who receive the same number will be in the same concept. After all the trainees find their own groups, Lay Zhang reveals the song assigned to each group. The 5 songs are, "Maze (迷宫)"(cute pop) "Tinder (火种)" (future pop), "I'm Sorry"(pop ballad), "TIME"(hip hop) and "Rebuild (重塑)"(future trap).

As practice begins, the instructors visit each group to check in. Jolin Tsai and Xu Minghao sit down and have an encouraging talk with the "Maze (迷宫)" group, who are losing spirit due to only 4 members ranking above 35.

Additionally, trainees participate in more activities. They visit a center for autistic children to volunteer and accompany the kids for a day. They also play basketball on an acupuncture mat, with team members wearing the basketball hoop.

The trainees sing "Goodbye" by A-Yue before Lay Zhang walks in and second ranking announcements begin. Due to the longer voting period, 263 million votes were accumulated. Li Wenhan remains rank 1 by a landslide of 6 million votes higher than rank 2 Guan Yue. Lin Yuzhi is revealed to be rank 35, saving himself from elimination. Additionally, the Artist Advisory Council selects six trainees to move on to the next stage. Three recommended trainees are already in the Top 35, but Bo Yuan, Wen Yechen and Zhan Yu are saved.

Episode 9 
After the second-ranking was announced, 38 trainees are regrouped according to the remaining group members. Among the five groups, only "TIME" have the correct number of members and do not need to adjust. "Rebuild (重塑)" must drop 3 members, "Tinder (火种)" must drop 2 members, and "I'm Sorry" must drop 1 member. The eliminated members will join the "Maze （迷宫）" group, who only have 2 original members remaining. The teams decide which members will leave by ranking each member in the group based on their suitability to the song. The trainees with the lowest rankings (least suitable) are voted out.

The teams perform and practice footage is shown. Guan Yue and Ding Feijun cheer up the new members of the "Maze (迷宫)" team, who are disappointed about being voted out. "TIME" team, who are all below rank 20, have an honest discussion about feeling the hardships of the program.

After the performances, each youth producer audiences will vote according to trainees’ performance on stage. Each youth producer has two votes. First, the youth producer will select the "most recommended" group from the five groups of concept evaluation teams and then select a "most recommended" trainee from the "most recommended" group. The group that has the most "most recommended" votes will receive a reward of 500,000 votes, and the rule of the reward boost value is obtained by the "most recommended" trainee in the group. The top three trainees from the top two groups are left unrevealed. They are Shi Zhan, Guan Yue, and Li Wenhan. Their result is not revealed until the 3rd ranking announcement.

Episode 10 

In this episode, the third-ranking was announced. The ranking results are based on the number of online votes from the youth producers and concept performance stages from March 15 to March 23, 2019, with a total of 118,430,860 votes. The top 20 trainees will enter the final stage and perform.

Wang Jieshi from the Artist Advisory Council gives all the trainees an open class to share his singing experiences. At the end of the open class, Teacher Wang Jieshi announces the fourth charitable activity called "Youth, Respect, and Accompanied with You". Wang Jieshi and all the trainees go to the Kangyuxuan Club Beijing Sunhe Senior Apartment to hold a birthday party for the elderly residents. The trainees are divided into two groups in this activity, one is responsible for accompanying the elderly, and the other is responsible for preparing talent shows for the birthday party.

The trainees also complete an obstacle course, trying to move as many gift boxes as possible while going through a ball pit. The trainees anonymously write letters to each other, but then read them out loud.

The ranking announcements begin. The "Rebuild (重塑)" team wins with 270 total votes, earning each member an additional 50,000 votes. Li Wenhan wins the individual vote with 129 votes, earning an additional 200,000 votes and retains his rank 1 position. Lian Huaiwei drops from rank 6 to rank 12, shocking all trainees. The final 20th spot is between Chen Tao and Gu Landi, and Chen Tao is revealed to be rank 20. The Artist Advisory Council additionally selects three outstanding trainees. Zhou Shiyuan is already in the Top 20, but Feng Junjie and Shao Haofan are saved.

The last mission is revealed: Final Stage. This assessment is the final stage performance before the final nine people form a group. The 22 trainees are divided into two groups to perform two more original songs. The lowest ranked trainees are able to pick their song and position first; however, higher ranked trainees are allowed to replace an already occupied position with themselves.

Episode 11 

A letter from the tutor: Each tutor writes an encouraging letter to all the trainees and read them at the beginning.

The release of the mentor cooperation stage task: this task is a special stage with no assessment, gathered together all the tutors of the program and the coaches and trainees to complete a collaboration stage. This time the rule of grouping is that trainees will send message to the tutors they want to perform within 15 minutes, and each trainee can only send one message to a certain tutor. If the tutor replies "I can" to the trainees within a limited time, they will be able to form a team. Jolin Tsai and Xu Minghao were not present at the time, so Li Ronghao and After journey replied on their behalf.

Each group's practice is shown first, and then their performance. After journey pranks his group and pretends to be upset so they can feel the bitterness of the song; however, the trainees prank him in return with Deng Chaoyuan storming out of the room, only to return with a birthday cake. Li Wenhan falls ill and cannot perform the collaboration stage with Lay Zhang, causing the group to redistribute positions at the last minute.

Episode 12 

This episode is the final episode of this season, and it is also a live broadcast. He Jiong becomes a special MC for the night. Nine Percent (sans Cai Xukun) also attends the finale as special guests to show they support.

The episode begins with trainees from the 22 standing in front of the rank 1 seat and talking about their experiences and hardships towards their dreams. After their speech, they yell "Can I do it?", and the remaining trainees shout back words of encouragement.

The live broadcast stars and all 99 trainees return to the stage to perform "Youth With You (青春有你)" live. The name of the debuting group is announced to be "UNINE".

After introductions from the mentors, Artist Advisory Council, and Nine Percent, the broadcast cuts to the selection of "Warm Color"'s center position. The selection process is done by the group performing the chorus, with each trainee taking the role of center once, then a closed voting process within the members of that group. The contenders for the center are Guan Yue and Jia Yi. Cutting back to the live broadcast, where "Warm Color"'s performers appear onstage, and Guan Yue is revealed as the center of the song.

"The Last Day" is performed next and goes through the same process center selection process, where the top 2 choices were Li Wenhan and He Changxi. Li Wenhan is revealed to be the center.

The trainees are also set to perform a special song "I Remember You". Once again, they must be evaluated, and only selected trainees will be able to perform the special stage. They complete a rehearsal assessment and were invited individually into a dark room standing in front of a screen. They are told they cannot go on stage this time; however, it is revealed to be a set up for video messages from their families. All 22 trainees perform an emotional special stage.

Another clip is shown that looks back on the charitable work and tasks the trainees did throughout the program. Jiang Dawei and Lay Zhang perform a collaborated remix of the theme song for "Journey to the West."

The announcement of UNINE begins. The rankings are announced from 8 to 1, and each trainee walks down the stage and gives a speech of thanks before going to their seat. Xia Hanyu is noted as having the biggest rise, as he began this season at rank 79 and debuts as rank 7. Li Zhenning also soars into rank 2. He Changxi is revealed as the 9th member, taking the last spot in UNINE.

A recap of unaired footage is played, including clips of trainees first entering and meeting each other on the evaluation stage, celebrating Chinese New Year, celebrating birthdays, group meals, and saying goodbye to each other in the dorms. After the memories are shown, the episode returns to the live broadcast where He Jiong and Lay Zhang wrap up the show.

Mission

Mission 1: Group evaluation 
Color key
 Winner 
 Leader
 Center

Mission 2: Position evaluation 
Color key

 Winner 
 Leader
 Center
 Leader & Center

Mission 3: Concept evaluation 
Color key

 Winner
 Leader
 Center

Mission 4: Mentor collaboration stage

Mission 5: Debut evaluation 
Color key

 Leader
 Center

Related Non-Profit Programs

Millions of Forests in China 
Youth With You with the "China Million Forest" Program, the People's Daily, and the China Foundation for Poverty Alleviation to create a series of the joint non-profit programs with the theme of "Youth with you and non-profit programs". The program includes the public welfare task as the assessment criteria of the trainee's grades, allowing the trainees to join the public welfare activities and encourage the whole society to join the non-profit program.

Hundreds of Beautiful Villages in China 
Li Wenhan, Chen Youwei, Deng Chaoyuan, Wang Jiayi, Hu Chunyang, Wang Hao and other trainees come to the "MaMaHua's Hillside" as the representatives of the China Poverty Alleviation Foundation "Hundreds of Beautiful Villages in China" Non-Profit Program - to experience the happy life as a farmer in Hebei Nanxun. The beautiful villages let the trainees linger on and plays so happily at the village. Many netizens say that they will bring their family and friends to come here as well.

The Child of Stars 
Under the leading of the art director Huang Doudou, the trainees entered the world of autistic children, hoping to call the attention from the whole society and illuminate their lonely world with the help from the whole society. In the rehabilitation center, according to the child's preferences, the trainees gently step to the inner world of the lonely child. Zhou Shiyuan and Fu Hongyi used music therapy to have fun with children. Lin Mo and Shi Mingze also took photos to those children.

Respecting and Accompanying the Elderly 
After releasing the theme of "Youth with you and non-profit programs" non-profit programs, the whole talent show use to the high requirements of the moral quality to restrict trainees. A large part of the talent show is related to the non-profit programs in order to encourage the audience to engage those programs with them. In this program, Wang Jieshi, a teacher from the art direction group, accompanied the trainees to the nursing home to give the old people the gift they needed most – companionship.

References 

2019 Chinese television seasons